Thakur Prasad Murmu (1931—2018) was a Santhali writer and educator. He wrote his first poetry book in 1947. Santal Hul is one of his notable publications.

References

1931 births
2018 deaths
Adivasi writers
20th-century Indian linguists
20th-century Indian poets
Santali people
Santali writers
People from East Singhbhum district